Saimoni Tamani (born 14 November 1944) is a Fijian former athlete who specialized in running the 400 metres.

Career 
Tamani won a gold medal in the 1966 South Pacific Games in Noumea. He won three gold medals at the 1969 South Pacific Games in Port Moresby.  At the 1970 Commonwealth Games in Edinburgh, Tamani won the bronze medal in the 400 metres with a time of 45.82 seconds. It was Fiji's first medal in athletics at the Commonwealth Games since 1950. He was slated to compete at the 1972 Summer Olympics in Munich but suffered a foot injury during the NCAA indoor track season. He was inducted into the Fiji Sports Hall of Fame in 1991.

Tamani was also a track star at Brigham Young University in Provo, Utah. A member of the Church of Jesus Christ of Latter-day Saints, Tamani was a resident of Longview, Washington in 1992.

Tamani is the assistant varsity track coach in Kalama, Washington.

Achievements

References

External links 

2009 Deseret Morning News Church Almanac (Salt Lake City, Utah: Deseret Morning News, 2008) p. 326.

Commonwealth Games bronze medallists for Fiji
Athletes (track and field) at the 1970 British Commonwealth Games
Fijian male sprinters
Fijian emigrants to the United States
Fijian Latter Day Saints
BYU Cougars men's track and field athletes
Living people
1945 births
Fijian male middle-distance runners
Commonwealth Games medallists in athletics
People from Kalama, Washington
Medallists at the 1970 British Commonwealth Games